Sviatoslav Dziadykevych (born August 6, 1995) is a Ukrainian footballer who plays as a forward.

Playing career 
Dziadykevych began at the academy level with FC Karpaty Lviv in 2012. In 2016, he played with FC Chortkiv in the Ukrainian Amateur Football League. He later signed with Nyva Ternopil in the Ukrainian Second League. In 2019, he played abroad in the Canadian Soccer League with FC Ukraine United.

References 

1995 births
Living people
Ukrainian footballers
FC Krystal Chortkiv players
FC Nyva Ternopil players
FC Ukraine United players
Canadian Soccer League (1998–present) players
People from Zboriv
Association football forwards
Ukrainian Second League players
Sportspeople from Ternopil Oblast